Aulay MacAulay Morrison (June 15, 1863 – February 27, 1942) was a Canadian lawyer, judge and Liberal politician who represented New Westminster in the House of Commons of Canada from 1896 to 1904.

Born in Baddeck, Nova Scotia, the son of Christopher Morrison and Flora MacAulay, Morrison was educated in Common Schools, at the Academies of Sydney and Pictou and at Dalhousie University where he graduated with the degree of Bachelor of Law in 1888. He was called to the Bar of Nova Scotia in 1888 and the Bar of British Columbia in 1890 where he moved to practice law. In 1900, he married Elizabeth Livingston. Morrison was named puisne judge in the Superior Court of British Columbia. In 1929, he was named Chief Justice in the Supreme Court of British Columbia. He died while still a judge in Vancouver at the age of 78.

References

External links
 

1863 births
1942 deaths
Lawyers in British Columbia
Judges in British Columbia
Schulich School of Law alumni
Liberal Party of Canada MPs
Members of the House of Commons of Canada from British Columbia
People from Baddeck, Nova Scotia